Basra-ye Pain (also Romanized as Başrā-ye Pā’īn; also known as Pā’īn Başrā and Pā’īn Başreh) is a village in Karipey Rural District, Lalehabad District, Babol County, Mazandaran Province, Iran. At the 2006 census, its population was 537, in 128 families.

References 

Populated places in Babol County